Meyer Bockstein (also Меер Феликсович Бокштейн or Meer Feliksovich Bokshtein or Bokstein) (4 October 1913 to 2 May 1990) was a  topologist from Moscow who introduced the Bockstein homomorphism. The Bockstein spectral sequence is named after him.

References

 
Russian Jewish Encyclopedia (Entry 791)

Topologists
1913 births
1990 deaths
Mathematicians from Moscow
Soviet mathematicians